Louis Gobet (born 28 October 1908, date of death unknown) was a Swiss footballer who played for Switzerland in the 1934 FIFA World Cup. He also played for FC Blue Stars Zürich and FC Bern 1894.

References

1908 births
Swiss men's footballers
Switzerland international footballers
1934 FIFA World Cup players
Association football defenders
Year of death missing
FC Bern players